Viva! Hysteria is a double live album by the English rock band Def Leppard released on the 22 October 2013. The album was recorded on 29 and 30 March 2013 during the band's residency of the same name at the Hard Rock Hotel and Casino (Las Vegas).

Content
The first disc, taken from the band's 30 March performance, contains all 12 tracks from Def Leppard's 1987 album Hysteria, followed by an encore of two hits from their 1983 album Pyromania, which were "Rock of Ages" and "Photograph." The second disc has a selection of deeper cuts, many of which the band had not played in many years or even decades prior to the residency. The band performed the songs on the second disc under the alias Ded Flatbird as the "opening act" for the show, before playing all the songs on the Hysteria album as Def Leppard later in the night. 

Tracks 1–8 on the second disc are eight of the nine songs played from the Ded Flatbird opening set on 29 March (excluding the fifth track played that night, "When Love & Hate Collide"). Tracks 9–15 on the second disc are the opening set from the following night, 30 March. This notably ends with the band playing all of side one of the band's 1981 album High 'n' Dry. Both Ded Flatbird sets open with the band playing a short excerpt of The Who's "Won't Get Fooled Again".

Track listing
Disc one (as Def Leppard)

Disc two (as Ded Flatbird)

DVD / Blu-ray
The DVD and Blu-ray releases, which also had a short stint in selected theaters around the world, contain the same track listing as the CD version, on one disc. The main difference is that the tracks on CD disc one comprise the main feature, and the songs on CD disc two are bonus features along with the Acoustic Medley.

Personnel
Joe Elliott – lead vocals - Also performed as his Ded Flatbird alias "Booty Reuben"
Rick Savage – bass, backing vocals - Also performed as his Ded Flatbird alias "Fleetwood Beck"
Phil Collen – guitar, backing vocals - Also performed as his Ded Flatbird alias "Chingy Chapman"
Vivian Campbell – guitar, backing vocals - Also performed as his Ded Flatbird alias "Linkin Twain"
Rick Allen – drums - Also performed as his Ded Flatbird alias "Camp Out"

Charts

References

2013 live albums
2013 video albums
Live video albums
Def Leppard live albums
Def Leppard video albums
Albums recorded at the Hard Rock Hotel and Casino (Las Vegas)
Frontiers Records live albums
Frontiers Records video albums